Province No. 2 of Nepal is one of the seven provinces of Nepal established by the country's new constitution of 20 September 2015, comprising eight districts, namely, Bara, Dhanusha, Mahottari, Parsa, Rautahat, Saptari, Sarlahi, and Siraha. There are many categorized monuments sites in Province No. 2. Here is district wise List of Monuments which is in the Province no. 2.

Lists per district of Province No. 2 
 List of monuments in Bara District
 List of monuments in Dhanusha District
 List of monuments in Mahottari District
 List of monuments in Parsa District
 List of monuments in Rautahat District
 List of monuments in Saptari District
 List of monuments in Sarlahi District
 List of monuments in Siraha District

References 

Province No. 2
 
Tourist attractions in Madhesh Province